Li Zhixuan (born 23 March 1994) is a Chinese long-distance runner. In 2015, she competed in the senior women's race at the 2015 IAAF World Cross Country Championships held in Guiyang, China. She finished in 75th place. In 2019, she finished in 5th place in the women's half marathon at the 2019 Summer Universiade held in Naples, Italy.

She competed in the women's marathon at the 2022 World Athletics Championships held in Eugene, Oregon, United States.

Competition record

References

External links 
 

Living people
1994 births
Place of birth missing (living people)
Chinese female long-distance runners
Chinese female cross country runners
Competitors at the 2019 Summer Universiade
Universiade medalists in athletics (track and field)
Universiade silver medalists for China
Athletes (track and field) at the 2020 Summer Olympics
Olympic athletes of China
20th-century Chinese women
21st-century Chinese women